Perindopril is a medication used to treat high blood pressure, heart failure, or stable coronary artery disease. 

As a long-acting ACE inhibitor, it works by relaxing blood vessels and decreasing blood volume. As a prodrug, perindopril is hydrolyzed in the liver to its active metabolite, perindoprilat. It was patented in 1980 and approved for medical use in 1988. 

Perindopril is taken in the form of perindopril arginine (trade names include Coversyl, Coversum) or perindopril erbumine (Aceon). Both forms are therapeutically equivalent and interchangeable, but the dose prescribed to achieve the same effect differs between the two forms. It is also often combined with another medication, sometimes in the same tablet (see #Combinations below).

Medical uses
Perindopril shares the indications of ACE inhibitors as a class, including essential hypertension, stable coronary artery disease (reduction of risk of cardiac events in patients with a history of myocardial infarction and/or revascularization), treatment of symptomatic coronary artery disease or heart failure, and diabetic nephropathy.

Combination therapy

With indapamide

In combination with indapamide, perindopril has been shown to significantly reduce the progression of chronic kidney disease and renal complications in patients with type 2 diabetes. In addition, the Perindopril pROtection aGainst REcurrent Stroke Study (PROGRESS) found that whilst perindopril monotherapy demonstrated no significant benefit in reducing recurrent strokes when compared to placebo, the addition of low dose indapamide to perindopril therapy was associated with larger reductions in both blood pressure lowering and recurrent stroke risk in patients with pre-existing cerebrovascular disease, irrespective of their blood pressure.  There is evidence to support the use of perindopril and indapamide combination over perindopril monotherapy to prevent strokes and improve mortality in patients with a history of stroke, transient ischaemic attack or other cardiovascular disease.

With amlodipine

The Anglo-Scandinavian Cardiac Outcomes Trial-Blood Pressure Lowering Arm (ASCOT-BLA) was a 2005 landmark trial that compared the effects of the established therapy of the combination of atenolol and bendroflumethiazide to the new drug combination of amlodipine and perindopril (trade names Viacoram, AceryCal etc.). The study of more than 19 000 patients world-wide was terminated earlier than anticipated because it clearly demonstrated a statistically significant improvement in mortality and cardiovascular outcomes with the newer treatment. The combination of amlodipine and perindopril remains in the current treatment guidelines for hypertension and the outcomes of the ASCOT-BLA trial paved the way for further research into combination therapy and newer agents.

Contraindications
Children
Pregnancy
Lactation
Situations where a patient has a history of hypersensitivity
Kidney failure

Precautions
Assess kidney function before and during treatment where appropriate.
Renovascular hypertension
Surgery/anesthesia
An analysis on the PROGRESS trial showed that perindopril has key benefits in reducing cardiovascular events by 30% in patients with chronic kidney disease defined as a CrCl <60ml/min. A 2016 and 2017 meta-analysis review looking at ACE inhibitors demonstrated a reduction in cardiovascular events but also slowed the decline of renal failure by 39% when compared to placebo. These studies included patients with moderate to severe kidney disease and those on dialysis. 
Its renoprotective benefits of decreasing blood pressure and removing filtration pressure is highlighted in a 2016 review. ACE inhibitor can result in an initial increase of serum creatinine, but mostly returns to baseline in a few weeks in majority of patients. It has been suggested that increased monitoring, especially in advanced kidney failure, will minimise any related risk and improve long-term benefits.
Use cautiously in patients with sodium or volume depletion due to potential excessive hypotensive effects of renin-angiotensin blockade causing symptomatic hypotension. Careful monitoring or short-term dose reduction of diuretics prior to commencing perindopril is recommended to prevent this potential effect. A diuretic may later be given in combination if necessary; potassium-sparing diuretics are not recommended in combination with perindopril due to the risk of hyperkalaemia.
Combination with neuroleptics or imipramine-type drugs may increase the blood pressure lowering effect. Serum lithium concentrations may rise during lithium therapy.

Side effects
Side effects are mild, usually at the start of treatment; they include:
Cough
Fatigue
Weakness/Asthenia
Headache
Disturbances of mood and/or sleep

Less often
Taste impairment
Epigastric discomfort
Nausea
Abdominal pain
Rash

Reversible increases in blood urea and creatinine may be observed. Proteinuria has occurred in some patients. Rarely, angioneurotic edema and decreases in hemoglobin, red cells, and platelets have been reported.

Composition
Each tablet contains 2, 4, or 8 mg of the tert-butylamine salt of perindopril. Perindopril is also available under the trade name Coversyl Plus, containing 4 mg of perindopril combined with 1.25 mg indapamide, a thiazide-like diuretic.

In Australia, each tablet contains 2.5, 5, or 10 mg of perindopril arginine. Perindopril is also available under the trade name Coversyl Plus, containing 5 mg of perindopril arginine combined with 1.25 mg indapamide and Coversyl Plus LD, containing 2.5 mg of perindopril arginine combined with 0.625 mg indapamide.

The efficacy and tolerability of a fixed-dose combination of 4 mg perindopril and 5 mg amlodipine, a calcium channel antagonist, has been confirmed in a prospective, observational multicenter trial of 1,250 hypertensive patients. A preparation of the two drugs is available commercially as Coveram.

Society and culture

Trade names
Perindopril is available under the following brand names among others:

Marketing
On 9 July 2014, the European Commission imposed fines of €427,700,000 on Laboratoires Servier and 5 companies which produce generics due to Servier's abuse of their dominant market position, in breach of European Union Competition law. Servier's strategy had included acquiring the principal source of generic production of Perindopril and entering into several pay-for-delay agreements with potential generic competitors.

References

Further reading

External links 
 

ACE inhibitors
Carboxamides
Enantiopure drugs
Ethyl esters
Indoles
Laboratoires Servier
Prodrugs
Propyl compounds